Haltiala (Finnish), Tomtbacka (Swedish) is a northwestern neighborhood of Helsinki, Finland.

Neighbourhoods of Helsinki